North Lilydale is a rural locality in the local government areas (LGA) of Dorset and Launceston in the North-east and Launceston LGA regions of Tasmania. The 2016 census recorded a population of 82 for the state suburb of North Lilydale.

History 
The locality was gazetted as “Lilydale North” in 1964. It was re-gazetted to its present name in 1971.

Geography
The boundaries consist primarily of survey lines and ridge lines.

Road infrastructure 
Route B81 (Golconda Road) passes to the west of the locality. From there North Lilydale Road provides access.

References

Towns in Tasmania
Localities of Dorset Council (Australia)
Localities of City of Launceston